Biomechanics and Modeling in Mechanobiology (BMMB) is a bimonthly peer-reviewed scientific journal published by Springer Science+Business Media. The journal was established in June 2002 and is currently edited by Gerhard A. Holzapfel and David Nordsletten. It publishes research articles about theoretical, computational, and experimental studies in the fields of biomedical engineering, biomechanics, and mechanobiology.

Impact factor 
According to the Journal Citation Reports, the journal has a 2021 impact factor of 3.623.

Scope 
The journal focuses on original research articles that investigate mechanical and/or biological phenomena at different levels of biological organization. Its scope includes cellular mechanobiology, interactions with other processes including growth and repair, diagnostic or therapeutic applications, and models of fluid mechanics and thermodynamics.

Editors-in-chief 
The current editors-in-chief are Gerhard A. Holzapfel (Graz University of Technology) and David Nordsletten (University of Michigan; King's College London). Past editors-in-chief include Jay D. Humphrey (Yale University), Larry Taber (Washington University in St. Louis) and Peter Hunter (Auckland Bioengineering Institute, University of Oxford).

References

External links 
 

Biomedical engineering journals
Bimonthly journals
Springer Science+Business Media academic journals
English-language journals
Publications with year of establishment missing